The Dar es Salaam pipistrelle (Pipistrellus permixtus) is a species of vesper bat. It is found only in Dar es Salaam Region and Pwani Region of Tanzania. Its natural habitat is subtropical or tropical dry forests.

References

Pipistrellus
Mammals described in 1957
Bats of Africa
Endemic fauna of Tanzania
Mammals of Tanzania
Taxonomy articles created by Polbot